Home is the eighth studio album by Australian country music artist Troy Cassar-Daley. The album was released in March 2012 and peaked at number 9 on the ARIA Charts, becoming Cassar-Daley's first top ten album.

The album reflects Cassar-Daley's connection to country and his family. Cassar-Daley was inspired to wear his heart on his sleeve after the floods of January 2011 devastated his farm property in Queensland.
  
At the ARIA Music Awards of 2012, the album was nominated for the ARIA Award for Best Country Album. At the 2013 Country Music Awards of Australia in Tamworth the album won Album of the Year.

Track listing

Charts

Weekly charts

Year-end charts

Release history

References

2012 albums
Liberation Records albums
Troy Cassar-Daley albums